Leopold Vogl, or Vogel, (16 September 1910 – 16 December 1991) was an Austrian footballer and manager who played for a number of clubs in Austria. He featured twice for the Austria national football team in 1935, scoring two goals.

Career statistics

International

International goals
Scores and results list Austria's goal tally first.

References

1910 births
1991 deaths
Footballers from Vienna
Austrian footballers
Austria international footballers
Association football forwards
Wiener AC players
Austrian football managers
FK Austria Wien managers